Trasadingen railway station is a railway station in the municipality of Trasadingen, in the Swiss canton of Schaffhausen. It is located on the standard gauge High Rhine Railway of Deutsche Bahn.

Services
 the following services stop at Trasadingen:

Customs
Trasadingen is, for customs purposes, a border station for passengers arriving from Germany. Customs checks may be performed in Trasadingen station or on board trains by Swiss officials. Systematic passport controls were abolished when Switzerland joined the Schengen Area in 2008.

References

External links
 
 

Railway stations in the canton of Schaffhausen